The Birgit Nilsson Prize is the largest prize in classical music, awarded approximately every three years to an active artist or institution who has contributed an important chapter to music history. 

Towards the end of her unparalleled, long and distinguished career, the legendary Swedish dramatic soprano Birgit Nilsson established the Birgit Nilsson Foundation exclusively to support this Prize. Being very concerned with the general decline of cultural values, in particular with the decline of performance standards in opera, and encountering much greater difficulties in the early years of her career than is generally known to the public, Birgit Nilsson believed that overcoming these difficulties motivated her and contributed to her future success. Along with honouring great artists and artistry, it was her hope in establishing this Prize to provide incentive and inspiration to young artists to sustain their efforts to reach full potential by planning their careers over the long term and to perpetuate the art form.

The philosophy behind the Birgit Nilsson Prize is to perpetuate the legacy of Birgit Nilsson and Sweden’s great operatic tradition by paying tribute to today’s outstanding, active figures in music, recognizing the excellence of their work and their major contributions.

Laureates
Birgit Nilsson personally chose the first laureate and put the chosen name in a sealed envelope to be opened three years after her death, which was on Christmas Day 2005. The envelope was opened on 20 February 2009 and the first laureate, who received the award, was the opera tenor and conductor Plácido Domingo.
Plácido Domingo’s worldwide career is legendary – singing 130 different roles, more than any other tenor in history. Domingo’s musicality is confirmed by his extraordinary repertoire and singing career as well as his accomplishments as a conductor, administrator, humanitarian, and creator of young artist programs and competitions.

In 2011, the second laureate, conductor Riccardo Muti, was selected by a distinguished international panel of classical music experts from the major countries where Birgit Nilsson was most active during her career. Cited for his "extraordinary contributions in opera and concert, as well as his enormous influence in the music world both on and off the stage."

The Birgit Nilsson Prize for 2014 was awarded to the Vienna Philharmonic, which is being recognized for its extraordinary contributions during its 172 years of work in opera and concert, as well as for its enormous worldwide influence in the music world both on and off the stage through live performance, recordings, and other media.

The prize for 2018 was awarded to the Swedish soprano Nina Stemme.

In 2022, cellist Yo-Yo Ma received the award. Reason: "Through exceptional musicianship, passion and dedication, Yo-Yo Ma’s commitment to music helps us to imagine and build a stronger society and better future".

Jury
The panel members, who are appointed by and work with the Foundation’s board and who serve for a period of three years, are currently:
 Susanne Rydén, Chairperson / President of the Birgit Nilsson Stiftelsen
 John Allison, Editor of Opera Magazine and critic of the Daily Telegraph (UK)
 Manuel Brug, opera and classical music critic for Die Welt (Germany)
 Stefan Forsberg, Executive and Artistic Director of the Royal Stockholm Philharmonic Orchestra (Sweden)
 Ara Guzelimian, Dean and Provost, Juilliard School of Music (USA)
 Elaine Padmore: consultant, broadcaster, author and former Director of Opera at the Royal Opera House, Covent Garden (UK)

Award Ceremony
The first and second award ceremonies of the Birgit Nilsson Prize took place at the Royal Swedish Opera in Stockholm. On the stage where Birgit Nilsson made her debut, King Carl XVI Gustaf of Sweden presented the prize personally to star tenor, conductor and opera house director Plácido Domingo in 2008, and to Maestro Riccardo Muti, the 2011 Prize laureate.
The Birgit Nilsson Prize for 2014 was presented to the Vienna Philharmonic Orchestra at the Concert Hall in Stockholm on October 8, 2014.

References

External links
Website of the Birgit Nilsson Prize
Website of the Swedish Royal Court
Website of the Swedish Royal Opera
Website of the Konserthuset (Stockholm Concert Hall)

Swedish music awards